Sucidava was an ancient settlement on the Danube, between Durostorum and Axiopolis, most probably located near the modern village of Izvoarele, in Romania. Not to be confused with the Sucidava near Oescus.

See also 
 Dacian davae
 List of ancient cities in Thrace and Dacia
 Dacia
 Roman Dacia

References

Ancient

Modern 

 

Dacian towns